Clark Hobart (1868-1948) was an American painter. His work is in the permanent collection of the Fine Arts Museums of San Francisco.

References

1868 births
1948 deaths
Artists from San Francisco
Painters from California
San Francisco Art Institute alumni
19th-century American painters
20th-century American painters